Sardar Hari Singh Dhillon (died 1765) was an 18th century Jat Sikh warrior and the chief of Bhangi Misl. During the formation of the  Dal Khalsa (Sikh army) he was acknowledged as leader of Taruna Dal, he was made 
chief of Bhangi Misl, the most powerful of all Misls.

Early life
Hari Singh Dhillon was the nephew and the adopted son of Bhuma Singh Dhillon, the founder of the Bhangi Misl, his father Bhup Singhwas Zamindar of Patoh near Wadni. After the death of Bhuma Singh he succeeded him as a chief of the Bhangi Misl.

Military career
He set up his headquarters in Gilwali, a village in Amritsar district. In 1762 after the Battle of Kup he attacked Kot Khwaja Saeed, the Governor of Lahore seizing a large amount of arms and ammunition from Saeed.

In 1763 he sacked Kasur, along with Jassa Singh Ramgarhia and Jai Singh Kanhaiya. In 1764 he advanced towards Multan. At first he sacked Bhawalpur, Multan was ravaged and then he crossed the Indus river, received tributes from Baluchi Chiefs in the districts of Muzaffargarh. On his return to Gilwali he plundered Jhang, Sialkot, Chiniot and made the Jammu ruler, Ranjit Deo, his tributary.

In 1764, he advanced towards Multan, At first he plundered Bahawalpur, Multan was thoroughly ravaged, He crossed river Indus and realized tribute from the Baluchi chiefs in the Muzaffargarh, Dera Ghazi Khan,  and Dera Ismail Khan, while returning he received tribute from  the local chief's of Pind Dadan Khan, Further on his way  he plundered Jhang, Chiniot, and Sialkot, He made Jammu tributary

Death and succession 
He died in 1765 in battle against Ala Singh. According to Kushwaqt Rae Hari Singh was poisoned to death and was succeeded by his son, Jhanda Singh Dhillon.

See also 

 Sikh Confederacy
 Misl
 Bhangi Misl

References

Year of birth missing
1765 deaths
Indian Sikhs
Jat rulers
Punjabi people
Sikh warriors